Hershfield is a surname. Notable people with the surname include:

Charles Hershfield (1910–1990), Canadian civil engineer
Harry Hershfield (1885–1974), American cartoonist, writer and radio personality
Joanne Hershfield (born 1950), American writer and filmmaker
Joe E. Hershfield, Canadian judge
Leo Hershfield (1904–1979),  American illustrator, cartoonist and courtroom artist